The Nevada Bureau of Mines and Geology (NBMG) is a research and public service unit of the University of Nevada and the State Geological Survey.  NBMG is also part of the Mackay School of Earth Sciences and Engineering at the University of Nevada in Reno. Scientists with the NBMG conduct research and publish their findings around topics which include, mineral and energy resources, engineering geology, environmental geology, earthquakes, groundwater, and geologic mapping in Nevada. In addition, the NBMG provides special services in the field of analytical geochemistry and assay standards, mineral and rock identification.  The NBMG provides earth-science education and in-service teacher training and continuing education for professional geoscientists, geologic and geotechnical information.

The NBMG operates the State's abandoned mine lands program, to identify, rank the degree of hazard, and secure mine sites that are no longer operating.  Since the inception of the program, over 2,400 sites have been secured.   It is estimated that some 50,000 sites in Nevada pose varying degrees of physical safety hazard to the public.  Field investigations have also yielded information that will be useful in determining the possibility of sites contributing to surface and groundwater contamination, such as acid mine drainage or excessive arsenic.

Mine Hazards

Mines in Nevada have produced millions of dollars from a variety of metals, including gold, silver, copper, iron, lead, tungsten, and zinc. Many mine openings were developed to explore for metals, but were never operating mines.

Arsenic and mercury, are the biggest threats exposing potentially toxic elements which are often found with deposits of gold and silver, were also produced locally.  These toxic elements of local concern include boron, cadmium, selenium, and thallium.  There are over 500 historic mining districts throughout the State of Nevada.

The State of Nevada has been studied as a potential location for the disposing of nuclear waste.  There is a necessary and respected approach to understanding of problems in the physical sciences and are particularly critical to evaluating the effectiveness of  potential nuclear waste isolation sites and strategies facing our Nation.  One site in particular is the Yucca Mountain, Nevada.  This site studied by the NBMG differs substantially from other potential repositories due to the finding of natural analogues of nuclear material that are currently being studied.

References

 
Bureau of Mines
 
University of Nevada, Reno